A border guard of a country is a national security agency that performs border security. Some of the national border guard agencies also perform coast guard (as in Germany, Italy or Ukraine) and rescue service duties.

Name and uniform
In different countries, names of particular border guard services vary significantly. The service may be called  "police", "guard", "troops" or "sentinel" and the name would refer to the nation's official term for the state border - whether it is "frontier" or "border".

Most border guards of the world use dark green-colored elements on their uniform, insignia or flags.

Tasks

Peacetime duties

Typical tasks of a border guard are:
 Controlling and guarding a nation's borders and protecting national borders.;
 Controlling border crossing persons, vehicles, and travel documents;
 Preventing illegal border crossing of persons, vehicles, cargoes and other goods;
 Controlling transportation of prohibited and limited items (e.g. weapons, ammunition, toxic substances, narcotics) over the national border;
 Supervising and controlling the observation of foreigner residence regulations, visa regime;
 Preventing the movement of goods and other art

borders, bypassing the customs control;
 Investigating cases related to offenses against the national border.
 Systematic and permanent observation of the state border space, from land, sea or air, by visual, electronic or other modern means of surveillance and protection, with the purpose of detecting, alerting and / or preventing possible violations in the international limit; It also involves verification and reporting on the maintenance and conservation of border markers.
 Prevent criminals, escapees from prisons or fugitives from the internal justice of the country evade and flee to other nations to evade the action of national justice
 Exchange all types of information and cooperate with other national agencies and counterparts in other countries, as well as with international organizations specializing in migration, border control, customs control, sanitary control, phytosanitary control and security to assist in the implementation of actions against the illicit trafficking of migrants, trafficking in persons, crimes related to transnational organized crime, terrorism, illegal trafficking in arms and explosives, corruption, drug trafficking and against the diversion, for illegal purposes, of dual-use goods and other activities related
  Immigration control duties.
The border guard may also perform customs.

Wartime duties
During wartime more militarized border guard services may be transferred to be under the control of a country's armed forces, if it is not so already.

Border guards by country

Australia

The Australian Border Force (ABF), is a part of the Department of Home Affairs, responsible for offshore and onshore border control enforcement, investigations, compliance and detention operations in Australia. The Force was established on 1 July 2015 merging the Australian Customs and Border Protection Service with the immigration detention and compliance functions of the then Department of Immigration and Border Protection.

The ABF is a law enforcement agency operating under the Australian Border Force Act 2015 with broadened legislative powers including the introduction of sworn officers. A new uniform was introduced and following the transition there was increase in the number of officers authorised to carry firearms.

Bangladesh

Border Guards Bangladesh is a paramilitary border security and anti-smuggling force under the Ministry of Home Affairs of Bangladesh. BGB can trace back its origin to the establishment of the Ramgarh Local Battalion in 1795. This force is lightly armed and although its primary duty is to protect the border, during national emergencies it can also be called upon to aid the government.

Canada

Canada Border Services Agency (CBSA) is a law enforcement agency of the Department of Public Safety and Emergency Preparedness. Created in 2003, it amalgamated the enforcement activities performed by three separate government entities (Canada Customs and Revenue Agency, Citizenship and Immigration Canada and the Canadian Food Inspection Agency). Traditionally unarmed, the arming of Border Services Officers, Investigators, and Inland Enforcement Officers began in 2007 and was completed in 2016. Officers are found at entry points to Canada (airports, marine entry points, and land crossing points with the United States).

Czech Republic
Alien Police Service is a highly specialized unit of the police of the Czech Republic, which carries out functions relating to the detection of illegal migration, application of punitive measures against foreigners staying in the Czech Republic in violation of the law no. 326/1999 Coll. On the residence of foreigners in the Czech Republic and amending certain laws, as amended laws, the tasks arising from international agreements and directly applicable European Community legislation and solving the crimes committed in connection with the crossing of the state border and cross-border crime. The Alien Police Service was established by the Ministry of Interior no. 67/2008 establishing units of the Police of the Czech Republic nationwide.

Alien Police of the Czech Republic is divided into:

Alien Police Service Directorate - is within the specified range managing, methodological and control department with jurisdiction throughout the Czech Republic and is directly subordinate to the Police Presidium of the Czech Republic

Alien Police Unions in the regional directorates of individual regions
 Department of residence controls, search and escort
 Department of residence matters
 Department documents and specialized activities
 Documentation Department
 Department of International Relations (only in border areas)

Egypt
The Egyptian Border Guard is under the control of the Ministry of Defence (Egypt). The Border Guard is a lightly armed paramilitary unit of about 25,000 personnel, responsible for border surveillance, general peacekeeping, drug interdiction, and prevention of smuggling. During the late 1980s, the force was equipped with remote sensors, night-vision binoculars, communications vehicles, and high-speed motorboats.

Finland
The Finnish Border Guard, including the coast guard, is the agency responsible for border control related to persons, including passport control and border patrol. The Border Guard is a paramilitary organization, subordinate to the Ministry of the Interior in administrative issues and to the President of the Republic in issues pertaining to the president's authority as Commander-in-Chief (e.g. officer promotions). The Finland-Russia border is a controlled border, routinely patrolled and protected by a border zone enforced by the Border Guard. Borders to Norway and Sweden are open borders, but the Border Guard maintains personnel in the area owing to its search and rescue (SAR) duties. There are two coast guard districts for patrolling maritime borders. The Border Guard has also detachments posted at ports and airports. In peacetime, the Border Guard trains special forces and light infantry and can be incorporated fully or in part into the Finnish Defence Forces when required by defence readiness. The Border Guard has police and investigative powers in immigration matters and can independently investigate immigration violations. The Border Guard has search and rescue (SAR) duties, both maritime and inland. The Guard operates SAR helicopters that are often used in inland SAR, in assistance of a local fire and rescue department or other authorities. The Border Guard shares border control duties with Finnish Customs, which inspects arriving goods, and the Finnish Police, which enforces immigration decisions such as removal.

France

The French Direction générale des douanes et droits indirects, Directorate-General of Customs and Indirect Taxes  is a law enforcement civilian agency responsible for levying indirect taxes, preventing smuggling, surveilling borders and investigating counterfeit money. The agency acts as a coast guard, border guard, sea rescue organisation and a customs service. Though it is a civilian service, agents are armed. In France, it is commonly known as "les douanes", which means customs ("la douane" is a border checkpoint). Agents are referred to as "douaniers", which means customs officers.
In the French legal standards, the prosecution carries the burden of proof since the defendant is presumed innocent; but in customs procedures, the defendant carries the burden of proof.

French Border Police, Police aux frontières or PAF (former Police de l'air et des frontières), also have to monitor the borders and conduct checks in some parts.

Germany

In Germany, the Federal Police, a civilian agency subordinated to the Ministry of Interior, is - besides other duties - responsible for border control tasks. Until 2005, the Federal Police was called Federal Border Guard, and originally was a paramilitary organisation having mandatory service in the 1970s, but had its military rank structure changed into a civilian one in the 1970s and lost its wartime combatant status in the 1990s.

State Border Guard 
The German state of Bavaria reestablished its State Border Police in the aftermath of the European migrant crisis in 2018 again, after it was merged into the Bavarian State Police in 1998 because of the Schengen Agreement.

Ghana 
In October 1964, the Border Guard Unit was formed as a police unit led by an assistant commissioner of police. The BGU acted as customs agents examining passengers and baggage aboard ships and aircraft. It forms part of the Ghana Revenue Authority. The primary operation of BGU is the detection and apprehension of illegal aliens as well as smugglers of aliens at or near the land borders.

Hong Kong 
Border guards in Hong Kong consists of two civilian agencies:
 Customs and Excise officers handling customs duties at ports, airports and land crossing.
 Immigration officers handle people entering ports, airport (1) and land crossings (6) with mainland China.

Hong Kong Police Force officers patrol the border with mainland China, but they are not border guards at entry points. Prior to 1995, this role was performed by British Army units stationed in Hong Kong.

Various police checkpoint booths (boundary crossing) are found along roads and are in the outside Closed Areas. Manned by uniformed Hong Kong Police officers, vehicle occupants must present papers and/or permits in order to proceed to the border. These officers act as informal border guards, which do not exist in Hong Kong as there is no international boundary with mainland China.

All three border agencies are responsibilities of the Security Bureau.

Hungary

In Hungary border control belongs to police since 2007. There is no different organization for this role. Policemen serving on the border have the very same uniform as those inside the country. Previously the Frontier Guard or Border Guard was a separate agency, the :hu:Határőrség Magyarországon.

Kyrgyzstan

The Frontier Forces are responsible for the border security of Kyrgyzstan. The Frontier Forces are commanded by the interior ministry, but are officially part of the military of Kyrgyzstan. They had many disagreements of the Frontier Service of Uzbekistan and had a military drill with China in August 2013.

India

Established on December 1, 1965, it is a component of the paramilitary forces of India (PMF) and its primary role is to guard India's international borders during peacetime and also prevent transnational crime. Like most paramilitary units of India, the BSF is under the administrative control of the Ministry of Home Affairs and is headed by an Indian Police Service Officer. It is one of the many law enforcement agencies of India.

The Indo-Tibetan Border Police (ITBP) is an Indian paramilitary force conceived on October 24, 1962, for security along the India's border with the Tibet Autonomous Region of China, border covering 2115 kilometers.

The Sashastra Seema Bal guards the Indo-Nepal and Indo-Bhutan borders.

Indonesia

Border security in Indonesia are conducted:
 At seaports, airports and land crossings : Customs officers oversee traffic of goods and Immigration officers oversee traffic of people.
 At land borders : To defend, guard and patrol the land borders of Indonesia with Malaysia (at Borneo), East Timor, and Papua New Guinea which are mainly within dense forest and mountainous terrains is conducted by the "Border Patrol Task Force" (Satuan Tugas Pengamanan Perbatasan abbreviated Satgas Pamtas), which are tasked to the Indonesian Army Infantry battalions.
 At sea borders :  Guarding and Patrolling of sea borders are conducted by joint-operation between Maritime Security Agency, Navy, Coast Guard, Maritime Police, Marine and Fisheries Resources Surveillance and Marine Customs.

Iran

The Islamic Republic of Iran Border Guard Command is the sole agency responsible for border patrol and control, acting under Law Enforcement Force (which itself is part of Armed Forces of Iran) since 2000. The agency also has coast guard duties in maritime borders. The control of entry points in airports are conducted by Islamic Revolutionary Guard Corps.

Israel

The Israel Border Police operates as a gendarmerie under the supervision of the Israel Police and was founded as part of the frontier corps before it became the Border Police.

Italy

In Italy the border police service is covered by the Guardia di Finanza, part of the Italian Armed Forces but under the operational control of the Finance Minister for its law enforcement duties; but there is also the Italian Customs Agency, a civilian administration that have the role of Customs Authority. Mostly, the Guardia di Finanza (or Fiamme Gialle) fight against smuggling, illegal drug trafficking, tax evasion and other financial crimes, even jointly to the Customs Agency. Also, many border posts are staffed by Carabinieri. The Immigration and Border Police also performs border police duties.

Latvia 

In Latvia the State Border Guard is in charge of protecting the border of the country. The armed organization is subordinate to the Ministry of the Interior.

Lithuania

The State Border Guard Service is the organisation charged with controlling and maintaining the Lithuanian Border. The State Border Guard Service falls under authority of the Ministry of the Interior, which supervises and controls the implementation of border guard policy.

Macau
Border patrol and immigration control in Macau are conducted by Public Security Police Force of Macau at land entries (4) with China and at Macau International Airport. Customs duties are performed by Macau Customs agency. Both border guards and customs officers are responsibilities of the Secretariat for Security.

Malaysia

The Border Security Agency is part of the Malaysian government agency that was recently established in 2015 to guard the country's entry and exit points from illegal activities such as smuggling, illegal migration and human trafficking. Before the establishment of the agency, Malaysian borders was guarded by the Malaysian Armed Forces and Malaysian Maritime Enforcement Agency.

Netherlands

The Royal Marechaussee is the fourth organization within the Armed Forces, besides Army, Navy and Air Force. Besides patrolling the border it also has the function of Military Police and protects the Royal Family.

North Korea
Border Security Command and Coastal Security Bureau are collectively responsible for restricting unauthorized cross-border (land and sea) entries and exits, in the early 1990s the bureaus responsible for border security and coastal security were transferred from the Ministry of State Security (North Korea) to the Ministry of People's Armed Forces. Sometime thereafter, the Border Security Bureau was enlarged to corps level and renamed the Border Security Command. Previously headquartered in Chagang Province, the Border Security Command was relocated to Pyongyang in 2002.

Pakistan

The Frontier Corps (FC) are four federal paramilitary forces recruited mostly from the tribal areas and led by officers from the Pakistan Army. The FC are stationed in the Khyber Pakhtunkhwa and Balochistan provinces. There are four distinct forces, known as FC Khyber Pakhtunkhwa (North), FC Khyber Pakhtunkhwa (South), FC Balochistan (North), and FC Balochistan (South). Each force is run by an "inspector general" who is a regular Pakistani Army officer of at least major-general rank, although the forces are officially part of the Interior Ministry.

The Pakistan Rangers are a pair of paramilitary forces under the control of the Ministry of the Interior. In 1995 the Pakistan Rangers divided into two parts; the Pakistan Rangers (Punjab) headquartered in Lahore and the Pakistan Rangers (Sindh) headquartered in Karachi. The two forces now have different uniforms and chains of command.

Russia

The Border Guard Service of Russia is (since 2003) an agency of the Federal Security Service.
The agency considers itself a direct successor of the Soviet Border Troops, and regularly celebrates the anniversary of the founding of the latter (May 28, 1918). This annual event, known as the Border Guards Day, is celebrated every year by the guards in active service as well as former servicemen in Moscow and throughout the country.

Future world champion and Olympic sport shooter Boris Polak served as a border guard in the Red Army on a mountain top near China, attaining the rank of colonel.

Serbia
The Border Units (Граничне Јединице) were the military border guard of Serbia, until their disbandment on 1 February 2007. The Border Units consisted of 17 battalions, totaling between 5,500 and 7,000 personnel. They were spread out over more than a hundred border posts. The fittest conscripts were assigned to the Border Units, and underwent training similar to Special Forces. Under Serbian and also Yugoslav law, the Border Units were the only military formations that were allowed to conduct combat operations during peacetime.

During the Kosovo war the Border Units regularly intercepted KLA fighters and arms smugglers coming from Albania. As the NATO bombing campaign was augmented by a ground offensive on the Federal Republic of Yugoslavia, specifically on Košare and Paštrik, the 53rd Border Battalion successfully defended the state border. They were also utilized in preventing illegal crossings of men and war material from North Macedonia to Serbia during the Insurgency in the Preševo Valley.

Today the border is guarded by the units of the Ministry of Internal Affairs, specifically the Border Police. Their tasks are defined as: monitoring of the state border, increasing the level of security on airports and international waterways on the Danube, Sava, and Tisa rivers, suppression of cross-border crime, risk analysis, controlling the movement and stay of foreigners, and operation of border crossings.

Singapore

As an island, Singapore is surrounded by water and does not share land borders with other countries. Hence, border security is the responsibility of the Police Coast Guard, a specialised division of the Singapore Police Force that monitors and enforces its maritime borders.

South Korea
Korea Immigration Service, a part of Ministry of Justice, is responsible for protecting border control and Enforcement. Korea Immigration Service issues Visa, controls traffic of Human at Port of entry and Immigration

Korea Customs Service, is a part of Ministry of Economy and Finance, responsible for enforce Customs such as Tariff and movement of goods at Port of entry

Spain
In Spain, the paramilitary Guardia Civil is responsible for protecting the borders. There is also a specialized service of the Department of Customs and Special Taxes, the Servicio de Vigilancia Aduanera, that has some general border guard duties.

Tajikistan

The Border Troops of Tajikistan, also called the Border Service, are part of the Military of Tajikistan and answer to the Interior Ministry. They often train with the Afghan Border Police, and jointly trained with the military of Kyrgyzstan in 2011.

Thailand

The Border Patrol Police is Thailand's police force responsible for border security and counter-insurgency, and operates as the law-enforcement arm in conjunction with Thahan Phran, the ranger paramilitary arm of the Royal Thai Army.

Turkey 

 Gümrükler Muhafaza

United Kingdom

Border guard services are provided by the Border Force, a law enforcement command within the Home Office. Border Force is responsible for immigration and customs enforcement at ports of entry into the UK, as well as in the UK's waters. Some territorial police forces on the south-east coast, such as Kent Police and Essex Police's marine units, also carry out limited immigration functions.

The UK's only land border, that with the Republic of Ireland, is not regularly patrolled by the UKBF, but is the responsibility of the Police Service of Northern Ireland.

United States

In the United States, border control is the responsibility of the Department of Homeland Security. This jurisdictional authority is shared by U.S. Customs and Border Protection (the primary inspection and enforcement component), the U.S. Coast Guard (the primary interdiction components) and U.S. Immigration and Customs Enforcement (the investigative component).

U.S. Customs and Border Protection (CBP) is composed of three distinct enforcement arms: the Office of Border Patrol (OBP, otherwise known as the United States Border Patrol), the Office of Field Operations (OFO; commonly called by its former name 'Customs') and the Office of Air and Marine (OAM). OBP is tasked with securing the international border in-between the Ports of Entry (POE) and is a mobile enforcement agency that is structured and employed like any other uniformed police department in the United States. OFO is the federal law enforcement branch tasked with administering the POE's (air, land or sea) and is responsible for determining the admissibility of all persons and goods into the United States. The OAM operates all aircraft and watercraft for CBP and coordinates their interdiction efforts with either OBP, U.S. Coast Guard and/or with U.S. Immigration and Customs Enforcement.

The U.S. Coast Guard is the only branch of military in the United States that is not subject to the Posse Comitatus Act of 1878. The reason being that both commissioned and petty officers are considered law enforcement officers with limited customs authority pursuant to 19 USC 1401. U.S. Coast Guard has jurisdiction in both domestic and international waters.

U.S. Immigration and Customs Enforcement has the same authority as both U.S. Customs and Border Protection and the U.S. Coast Guard, with the added jurisdiction of investigating violations that occur at both the border and the interior of the United States.

Vietnam
Vietnam Border Guard (Bộ đội Biên phòng Việt Nam) is a branch of Vietnam People's Army and is under command of Ministry of Defence (Vietnam). It has important roles in protecting Vietnam's sovereignty, maintaining security at land and sea borders. Vietnam Border Guard is established on 3 March 1959. It is organised into three levels: National Command, Provincial Command, and Local Post.

See also
 List of national border guard agencies
 Security police
 Coast guard
 Border outpost
 Border checkpoint
 Border Patrol (disambiguation)

References

External links 

 Alien Police Service of the Czech Republic